Volcano: An Inquiry into the Life and Death of Malcolm Lowry is a 1976 Canadian documentary film about writer Malcolm Lowry. Written and directed by Donald Brittain and John Kramer, it was nominated for the Academy Award for Best Documentary Feature, and won the Canadian Film Award for Best Documentary Over 30 Minutes at the 27th Canadian Film Awards.

It can currently be seen as a bonus feature on the Criterion Collection DVD release of Under the Volcano.

Cast
 Richard Burton as Malcolm Lowry (voice)

References

External links
 Watch Volcano: An Inquiry into the Life and Death of Malcolm Lowry at NFB.ca

1976 films
1976 documentary films
Canadian documentary films
Best Short Documentary Film Genie and Canadian Screen Award winners
Documentary films about writers
Films directed by Donald Brittain
National Film Board of Canada documentaries
1970s English-language films
1970s Canadian films